Fried in London is the second album of London-based 'wildstyle' band King Prawn. It was released in April 1998, and re-released in 2001.

Track listing
 The Sound of We
 Not Your Punk
 Felled
 Increase the Pressure
 Role Model
 Racist Copper
 Survive
 Depths of My Soul
 Clocked
 Rewards and Prizes
 Last Request
 Faith (demo version) - (bonus track on re-release)
 Come Out (demo version) - (bonus track on re-release)
 Depths of My Soul (multimedia track) - (bonus track on re-release)

References

External links
 myspace.com/originalkingprawn
 Golf Records profile of King Prawn 
 King Prawn interview

King Prawn (band) albums
1998 albums